Jenö Staehelin (born 14 january 1940) is a Swiss diplomat and lawyer. He was the first Swiss Permanent Representative to the United Nations in New York from 2002 to 2004, and president of the UNICEF Executive Board at the international level in 2003. He was Vice President of the European Patent Office in Munich from 1977 to 1984. He was the Swiss Ambassador to Japan from 1993 to 1997.

References

External links
 

Ambassadors of Switzerland to Japan
Chairmen and Presidents of UNICEF
Permanent Representatives of Switzerland to the United Nations
1940 births
Living people
Swiss officials of the United Nations